Großer Pälitzsee is a lake in the Mecklenburgische Seenplatte district in Mecklenburg-Vorpommern, Germany.

At Strasen, at the eastern end of the lake, a canal and lock gives access to the Ellbogensee and the navigable River Havel.

References 

Lakes of Mecklenburg-Western Pomerania
Federal waterways in Germany
LGrosserPalitzsee